"Back Home Again" is a popular song written and performed by the American singer-songwriter John Denver. "Back Home Again" was released as a single from his album of the same name in 1974.

Background
"Back Home Again" peaked at number five on the Billboard Hot 100 chart in November of that year; it was Denver's fifth Top 10 hit on the pop chart. "Back Home Again" topped the adult contemporary chart for two weeks. The single was the first of three number ones on the country music chart where it stayed for a single week. The single was certified a gold record by the RIAA. The song won a CMA Award for Denver in 1975 in the category "Song of the Year"; he was also named "Entertainer of the Year" at the same ceremony, prompting country pop singer Charlie Rich to light the envelope on fire after reading that Denver had won—in an apparent insult to Denver's musical style and image.

Reception
Cash Box called it a "laid back and mellow song, with some fine arranging by Lee Holdridge." Record World said it was "well-constructed."

Chart performance

Weekly Charts

Year-end charts

References 

1974 singles
John Denver songs
Songs written by John Denver
1974 songs
Song recordings produced by Milt Okun
RCA Records singles